Alice Waddington (born July 31, 1990) is a Spanish film director, writer, photographer and costume designer having developed most of her work in the field of modern cinema. Her directing style is defined by a contemporary approach to the golden era of large-scale-studio horror films (1920s1970s) in classical production companies such as Hammer Films or Universal's Creature Features; mixed with current surreal humor and sometimes including musical cinema.

Early life 
Born as Irene  on July 31, 1990, in Bilbao, Spain to a Catalan psychologist and a Galician teacher, Waddington adopted her stage name at sixteen, while assisting director of photography Quique López. At 18, she studied advertising at UPV-EHU University  where she started capturing promotion stills and directing fashion films as a photographer and assistant of photography for the Spanish editions of Harper's Bazaar, Neo2 and others.

Career
At 20 and for three years, she worked as an advertising creative, a producer and an advertising video editor at the agencies Leo Burnett Iberia and Social Noise also specializing as a digital storyboard artist.

In 2014, with the help of Mexican executive producer Yadira Ávalos, Waddington took a year off advertising agency work to write and direct a short movie. She found sponsors to help her produce her first narrative 11-minute film, Disco Inferno (2015), which received nominations in 63 international film festivals including genre fan favorites such as Palm Springs, Fantasia, Sitges (Noves Visions Short award) or Fantastic Fest, which first awarded her as Best Director in her category, and second best feature project of the Fantastic Market for her movie Paradise Hills. Eleven other international festival wins ensued, with a considerable comparative presence of the short picture in American and Canadian festivals.

Waddington entered pre-production of her first full-length feature, Paradise Hills in 2017 with Spanish production company Nostromo Pictures. The film is a science-fiction thriller written by Brian DeLeeuw and Nacho Vigalondo. It was released in 2019.

Waddington has pointed out in interviews that after Paradise Hills she desires to direct biopics, socially metaphorical fantastic horror about minorities and terror stories that have taken place.

In June 2019, it was announced that Waddington is developing her second film Scarlet, from a script written by her and Kristen SaBerre. The film will be  distributed by Netflix.

In September 2021, Waddington was tapped to direct adaptation of comic book series Dept. H for Netflix.

Social activism 
Waddington is a proactive demander for progressive social change regarding causes related to female cooperation  and sorority within the arts.

In the context of film, she has been vocal about the need for both more female-led and more diversely-cast films worldwide and about motivating young women to enroll into filmmaking programs. She has also often mentioned the need for film studios around the world to hire more women, with an accent on women of color.

Personal life
Waddington is fluent in Spanish and English and conversational in French and Catalan.

Filmography

Film

Awards
Waddington's short film "Disco Inferno" has been presented on 63 plus, genre and conventional film festivals across the world, winning several awards:

References 

1990 births
Living people
Film directors from the Basque Country (autonomous community)
People from Bilbao
Spanish film directors
21st-century Spanish women artists
Spanish women film directors
Spanish women screenwriters
Spanish people of Catalan descent
Spanish people of Galician descent
Spanish activists
Spanish feminists
University of the Basque Country alumni